Adult Contemporary is a chart published by Billboard ranking the top-performing songs in the United States in the adult contemporary music (AC) market.  In 1985, 19 songs topped the chart, then published under the title Hot Adult Contemporary, based on playlists submitted by radio stations.

In the year's first issue of Billboard the number one song was "Do What You Do" by Jermaine Jackson, which was in its third week at number one.  It held the top spot for a single week in 1985 before being replaced by "All I Need" by actor Jack Wagner, best known for his role as Frisco Jones on the soap opera General Hospital.  While continuing his acting career, Wagner released several albums in the 1980s.  Two acts tied for the highest number of weeks at number one in 1985, each spending six weeks atop the chart.  Kool & The Gang spent six consecutive weeks at number one with "Cherish", the longest unbroken run at number one during the year.  British singer Phil Collins spent three weeks in the top spot with "One More Night" and the same length of time at number one with "Separate Lives", a duet with American vocalist Marilyn Martin.  The only act other than Collins with more than one number one in its own right was the family group DeBarge, who topped the chart with both "Rhythm of the Night" and "Who's Holding Donna Now", although Lionel Richie and Stevie Wonder each achieved one solo chart-topper and also reached number one as part of the charity supergroup USA for Africa.

Collins was one of a number of British acts to top the chart during 1985, as the American music market continued to feel the effects of the so-called Second British Invasion.  Another was Wham!, whose song "Careless Whisper" spent five weeks in the top spot.  In the duo's native United Kingdom, the song was released as a solo single by frontman George Michael, but the group's American label took the decision to release it under the name Wham! featuring George Michael.  It was one of several of the year's AC chart-toppers which also reached number one on Billboards all-genres listing, the Hot 100.  Whitney Houston's "Saving All My Love for You" was a triple chart-topper, reaching the top spot on the Hot 100, the AC chart and the Hot Black Singles listing.  Stevie Wonder's "Part-Time Lover" went one better, topping the same three charts and also the Hot Dance/Disco Club Play listing.  USA for Africa's "We Are the World", a charity single intended to relieve starving people in Africa, particularly those feeling the effects of a lengthy famine in Ethiopia, became the fastest-selling American pop single in history and dominated radio airplay.  As a result, it topped the Hot 100, Hot Adult Contemporary and Hot Black Singles, as well as the Hot Dance/Disco 12 Inch Singles Sales chart.  The final number one of 1985 was "Say You, Say Me" by Lionel Richie, which occupied the top spot for the final four weeks of the year.

Chart history

See also
1985 in music
List of artists who reached number one on the U.S. Adult Contemporary chart

References

1985
1985 record charts
1985 in American music